Andrew James McKenna Sr. (September 17, 1929 – February 7, 2023) was an American businessman and chairman emeritus of McDonald's from 2016 until his death, having been chairman from 2004 to 2016, and a director from 1991.

Early life
McKenna was born in Chicago, Illinois on September 17, 1929. He graduated from the University of Notre Dame with a bachelor's degree in business administration and marketing, followed by a Doctor of Jurisprudence degree from DePaul University College of Law.

Career
McKenna was chairman of McDonald's from 2004 to 2016. He was a director of the Chicago Bears, Aon, and Skyline Corporation. McKenna and Patrick Ryan, chairman of Aon together owned 19.7% of the Chicago Bears.

McKenna owned Schwarz Supply Source Inc, a Morton Grove-based paper company, which is a supplier to McDonald's, "making him something less than totally independent", according to Crain's Chicago Business.

Personal life and death
McKenna married Mary Joan Pickett on June 20, 1953, and they had five daughters and two sons. His son Andrew J. McKenna Jr. is a former chairman of the Illinois Republican Party.

McKenna died in Winnetka, Illinois on February 7, 2023, at the age of 93.

Awards
McKenna was inducted as a laureate of The Lincoln Academy of Illinois and awarded the Order of Lincoln (the State's highest honor) by the Governor of Illinois in 2000 in the area of Social Services.

References

1929 births
2023 deaths
McDonald's people
American food industry business executives
DePaul University College of Law alumni
Businesspeople from Chicago
University of Notre Dame Trustees
Mendoza College of Business alumni